The CW Television Network is a successor and rebrand of both the previous two operations of the network: The WB and UPN, both of which launched within one week of each other in 1995. Mark Pedowitz is the current president of The CW Television Network. He replaced Dawn Ostroff in 2011, who had been the Head of Entertainment since the network's inception in 2006. Pedowitz oversees all aspects of The CW, including programming, sales, marketing, distribution, finance, research and publicity. On October 3, 2022, Pedowitz confirmed that he would be leaving the network after 11 years as president and CEO when Nexstar Media Group took over 75% interest ownership in the network, and would be replaced by Nexstar executive Dennis Miller as the new president.

UPN

Lucie Salhany (1995-1997)
She moved back to Paramount as they were about to launch the United Paramount Network, also known as the UPN—which later merged with The WB. Salhany was Chief Executive Officer of UPN from 1995 to 1997.

Dean Valentine (1997-2002)

Dawn Ostroff (2002-2006)
From 2002 to 2006, Ostroff served as president of the UPN Network, a subsidiary of CBS, where she developed the popular reality series America’s Next Top Model, along with other programs including Veronica Mars, Star Trek: Voyager, WWE SmackDown, Girlfriends, Moesha, Everybody Hates Chris and Dilbert. From 1996 to 2002, she served as executive vice president of entertainment at Lifetime Television and led the network to rise from sixth to become the #1-rated cable network in prime time.

Beginning in 2006, Ostroff was president of entertainment for The CW broadcast network - a joint venture of CBS and Warner Bros. Ostroff was in charge of programming, digital initiatives, branding, marketing, research and sales. As president, she developed several TV series, including Gossip Girl and The Vampire Diaries.

The WB

Garth Ancier (1995-1999)
In 1994, Ancier re-teamed with Fox colleague Jamie Kellner and Warner Bros. CEO Barry Meyer to launch The WB as its chief programmer from 1994 to 1999, where he helped put 7th Heaven, Dawson's Creek, Charmed, Buffy the Vampire Slayer, The Steve Harvey Show and The Jamie Foxx Show on the air.

Susanne Daniels (1999-2003)
She developed TV shows such as Dawson's Creek, Buffy The Vampire Slayer, and Gilmore Girls

While at The WB, Daniels co-authored the book Season Finale: The Unexpected Rise and Fall of The WB and UPN along with Cynthia Littleton.

David Janollari (2003-2006)

References